The men's freestyle middleweight competition at the 1964 Summer Olympics in Tokyo took place from 11 to 14 October at the Komazawa Gymnasium. Nations were limited to one competitor.

Competition format

This freestyle wrestling competition continued to use the "bad points" elimination system introduced at the 1928 Summer Olympics for Greco-Roman and at the 1932 Summer Olympics for freestyle wrestling, as adjusted at the 1960 Summer Olympics. Each bout awarded 4 points. If the victory was by fall, the winner received 0 and the loser 4. If the victory was by decision, the winner received 1 and the loser 3. If the bout was tied, each wrestler received 2 points. A wrestler who accumulated 6 or more points was eliminated. Rounds continued until there were 3 or fewer uneliminated wrestlers. If only 1 wrestler remained, he received the gold medal. If 2 wrestlers remained, point totals were ignored and they faced each other for gold and silver (if they had already wrestled each other, that result was used). If 3 wrestlers remained, point totals were ignored and a round-robin was held among those 3 to determine medals (with previous head-to-head results, if any, counting for this round-robin).

Results

Round 1

 Bouts

 Points

Round 2

Five of the 16 wrestlers were eliminated, four with two losses and one with a loss by fall and a tie. Güngör was the only wrestler left with 0 points.

 Bouts

 Points

Round 3

Three wrestlers were eliminated. Güngör remained in the lead, now with 1 point.

 Bouts

 Points

Round 4

Hollósi and Sasaki's draw eliminated both wrestlers. Bauch and Faiz were also eliminated in losses. Güngör's loss moved him to 4 points, now behind Gardzhev at 2 points and Brand at 3 points. Mahdizadeh picked up a 5th point.

 Bouts

 Points

Round 5

Mahdizadeh defeated Gardzhev, but was eliminated by the win while Gardzhev had only 5 points and continued. Brand was eliminated by his loss to Güngör, who also reached 5 points and was not eliminated. With Brand and Mahdizadeh both at 6 points, the bronze medal was decided by their head-to-head result from round 2; since it was a draw, Brand won due to his lower body weight.

 Bouts

 Points

Final round

With two remaining wrestlers who had not yet faced each other, there was a final bout for the gold and silver medals. Gardzhev and Güngör wrestled to a draw. Gardzhev took the gold medal due to lower body weight.

 Bouts

 Points

References

Wrestling at the 1964 Summer Olympics